Souleymane Sylla  (born 5 May 1984) is a professional footballer who plays as a striker.

External links
lfp.fr 
francefootball.fr 

1984 births
Living people
Association football forwards
Guinean footballers
FC Istres players
BSC Young Boys players
AC Ajaccio players
Ligue 2 players